Gobessa is a town in southeastern Ethiopia. It is the administrative center of Shirka woreda.

According to the Oromia Regional government, this town currently has a telephone station and a post office. Recently it has got access to  electric power. It is also being connected to other nearby towns such as medero and Ticho.

Based on figures from the Central Statistical Agency in 2005, Gobessa has an estimated total population of 10,170 of whom 5,010 were males and 5,160 were females. The 1994 national census reported this town had a total population of 5,689 of whom 2,717 were males and 2,972 were females.

"Local History in Ethiopia"  (pdf) The Nordic Africa Institute website (accessed 19 January 2008)</ref>

Notes 

Populated places in the Oromia Region